Norway sent a delegation to compete at the 1960 Summer Paralympics in Rome, Italy. Its athletes finished sixth in the overall medal count. Most of their medals were won in swimming.

Medalists

See also 

 Norway at the Paralympics
 Norway at the 1960 Summer Olympics

References 

Nations at the 1960 Summer Paralympics
1960
Summer Paralympics